Rama is a fictional character based on Hindu Avatar Rama published by DC Comics, and a potential love interest of Wonder Woman. He first appears in Wonder Woman #148 series 2 (September 1999) and was created by Eric Luke and Yanick Paquette.

Fictional character biography
Rama-Chandra is the seventh avatar of the Hindu god Vishnu,  born a prince on Earth in ancient times. In the Indian epic Ramayana, he vanquished the demon king Ravana for abducting his consort Sita.

In the comics, he met Wonder Woman after Cronus, a Titan of Myth, and his progeny the Hecatonchires and Cyclopes ransacked Olympus and attempted to destroy the Hindu gods. The Child of Cronus known as Oblivion trapped Rama and Wonder Woman in a dream realm where the two were united in wedded bliss. The false memories of this illusion were shattered when Diana defeated Oblivion, but Rama supposedly remained infatuated.

A certain attraction between Rama and Wonder Woman was evident, but nothing ultimately came of it since the character was not used by subsequent writers. Rama eventually left for parts unknown after going berserk and channeling Kali in the battle against a human mutated into an arachnoid by Doctor Poison's Pandora Virus.

Powers and abilities
 As an avatar of the Hindu god Vishnu, Rama possesses the power of flight, and in battle he wields a sword and the bow of Vayu, which shoots flaming arrows (much like those of modern-day Indian heroine Maya).
 When his life is in danger, he is able to enter a berserker rage that heals all his wounds, and cures all toxins, at the expense of him destroying his surroundings and killing any nearby humans. While berserk, he removes his crown to expose his third eye and grows two extra arms, taking on the superficial features of Kali. According to myth features like the 'third eye' and 'berserker rage' are attributed to another Hindu god Shiva, one of the three major deities of Hinduism. Moreover, Kali is an extremely different concept in mythology, but they have been mixed up in the comics for entertainment purposes.

Notes
 Rama, Celsius, Maya, Ravan, Agni, Aruna, Chimera (Sanjeet Bhatia from Team Titans Annual #1), Jinx, Tong (Golden Age servant of Zatara from Action Comics #1), and Savitar are all Asian Indian characters published by DC Comics.

See also
List of Wonder Woman supporting characters

References

External links
DCU Guide: Rama

DC Comics characters who use magic
DC Comics characters with superhuman strength
DC Comics deities
DC Comics superheroes
Fictional archers
Indian superheroes
Works based on the Ramayana